Pratylenchus loosi is a plant pathogenic nematode infecting tea.

References 

loosi
Plant pathogenic nematodes
Tea diseases